Feryal Özel (born May 27, 1975) is a Turkish-American astrophysicist born in Istanbul, Turkey, specializing in the physics of compact objects and high energy astrophysical phenomena. As of 2022, Özel is the Department Chair and a professor at the Georgia Institute of Technology School of Physics in Atlanta. She was previously a professor at the University of Arizona in Tucson, in the Astronomy Department and Steward Observatory.

Özel graduated summa cum laude from Columbia University's Fu Foundation School of Engineering and Applied Science and received her PhD at Harvard University with Ramesh Narayan acting as Thesis advisor. She was a Hubble Fellow and member at the Institute for Advanced Study in Princeton, New Jersey. She was a Fellow at the Harvard-Radcliffe Institute and a visiting professor at the Miller Institute at UC Berkeley.

Özel is widely recognized for her contributions to the field of neutron stars,  black holes, and magnetars. She is a member and Modeling lead of the Event Horizon Telescope (EHT) that released the first image of a black hole.

Özel received the Maria Goeppert Mayer award from the American Physical Society in 2013 for her outstanding contributions to neutron star astrophysics. Özel has appeared on numerous TV documentaries including Big Ideas on PBS and the Universe series in the History Channel.

Along with Alexey Vikhlinin, Özel is the Science and Technology Definition Team Community Co-chair for the Lynx X-ray Observatory NASA Large Mission Concept Study.

Education
The following list summarizes Prof. Özel's education path:
 1992 - Üsküdar American Academy, İstanbul, Turkey
 1996 - BSc in Physics and Applied Mathematics, Columbia University, New York City
 1997 - MSc in Physics, Niels Bohr Institute, Copenhagen
 2002 - PhD in Astrophysics, Harvard University, Cambridge, USA

Honors and awards
 Breakthrough Prize, 2020 
 Chair, Astrophysics Advisory Committee (APAC), NASA, 2019
 Fellowship, John Simon Guggenheim Memorial Foundation, 2016
 Visiting Miller Professorship, University of California Berkeley, 2014
 Maria Goeppert Mayer Award, American Physical Society, 2013
 Fellowship, Radcliffe Institute for Advanced Studies, 2012-2013
 Bart J. Bok Prize, Harvard University, 2010
 Lucas Award, San Diego Astronomy Association, 2010
 Visiting Scholar Fellowship, Turkish Scientific and Technical Research Foundation, 2007
 Hubble Postdoctoral Fellowship, 2002-2005
 Distinguished Scholar Award, Daughters of Atatürk Foundation, 2003
 Keck Fellowship, Institute for Advanced Study, 2002
 Van Vleck Fellowship, Harvard University, 1999
 Kostrup Prize, Niels Bohr Institute, 1997
 Niels Bohr Institute Graduate Fellowship, 1996-1997
 Applied Mathematics Faculty Award, Columbia University, 1996
 Fu Foundation Scholarship, Columbia University, 1994-1996
 Research Fellowship, CERN, 1995
 Turkish Health and Education Foundation Scholarship, 1992-1994

References

External links
"Big Ideas" Website (Resume)
Personal webpage at the University of Arizona 
Nature Magazine online service

List of published articles according to IOP Publishing
List of published articles according to NASA/ADS

Georgia Tech faculty
University of Arizona faculty
American women astronomers
Columbia School of Engineering and Applied Science alumni
Harvard University alumni
Living people
1975 births
Turkish women academics
Academics from Istanbul
People associated with CERN
American astrophysicists
American people of Turkish descent
Harvard–Smithsonian Center for Astrophysics people
Turkish astronomers
Black holes
Hubble Fellows